Following is a table of United States presidential elections in Louisiana, ordered by year. Since its admission to statehood in 1812, Louisiana has participated in every U.S. presidential election except the election of 1864, during the American Civil War. At that time, Louisiana was controlled by the Union and held elections, but electors were not ultimately counted.

Winners of the state are in bold. The shading refers to the state winner, and not the national winner.

Elections from 1864 to present

Election of 1860
The election of 1860 was a complex realigning election in which the breakdown of the previous two-party alignment culminated in four parties each competing for influence in different parts of the country. The result of the election, with the victory of an ardent opponent of slavery, spurred the secession of eleven states and brought about the American Civil War.

Elections from 1828 to 1856

Elections from 1812 to 1824
In elections from 1812 to 1824, Louisiana did not conduct a popular vote. Each Elector was appointed by state legislature.

The election of 1824 was a complex realigning election following the collapse of the prevailing Democratic-Republican Party, resulting in four different candidates each claiming to carry the banner of the party, and competing for influence in different parts of the country. The election was the only one in history to be decided by the House of Representatives under the provisions of the Twelfth Amendment to the United States Constitution after no candidate secured a majority of the electoral vote. It was also the only presidential election in which the candidate who received a plurality of electoral votes (Andrew Jackson) did not become President, a source of great bitterness for Jackson and his supporters, who proclaimed the election of Adams a corrupt bargain.

See also
 Elections in Louisiana

Notes

References